Dieginho Fernando Calderon Caicedo (born December 13, 1989) is a professional Colombian footballer who currently plays for Wadi Degla as a striker.

Career
In June 2015, Calderon joined Zacatepec on loan.
Calderon began his career with Ismaily SC by scoring on his debut against Al Nasr Lel Taa'den.
In January 2020, Iraqi Premier League champions Al-Shorta bought Calderon.

References

External links

Soccerway Profile

1989 births
Living people
Colombian footballers
Colombian expatriate footballers
Association football forwards
Sportspeople from Antioquia Department
Envigado F.C. players
Ocelotes UNACH footballers
Alebrijes de Oaxaca players
Club Atlético Zacatepec players
Ismaily SC players
Al-Faisaly FC players
Kuwait SC players
Al-Shorta SC players
Wadi Degla SC players
Categoría Primera A players
Liga Premier de México players
Ascenso MX players
Egyptian Premier League players
Saudi Professional League players
Kuwait Premier League players
Iraqi Premier League players
Colombian expatriate sportspeople in Mexico
Colombian expatriate sportspeople in Egypt
Colombian expatriate sportspeople in Saudi Arabia
Colombian expatriate sportspeople in Kuwait
Expatriate footballers in Mexico
Expatriate footballers in Egypt
Expatriate footballers in Saudi Arabia
Expatriate footballers in Kuwait
Expatriate footballers in Iraq
Colombian expatriate sportspeople in Iraq